Cardinal Place is a retail and office development in London, near Victoria Station and opposite Westminster Cathedral. The site consists of three buildings covering over a million square feet on Victoria Street next door to Portland House, and was designed by EPR Architects and built by Sir Robert McAlpine.

The topping out ceremony was held in December 2004, and performed by Cardinal Cormac Murphy-O'Connor, Lord McAlpine, and Ian J. Henderson, outgoing chief executive of the site's developers Land Securities.

The £200m development was built directly over the District & Circle line Underground tunnels which actually pass through the basement. The buildings rest on rubber shock absorbers to prevent vibrations from the passing trains.

Tenants include Experian.

References

External links

Shopping centres in the City of Westminster
Office buildings in London
Retail buildings in London
Privately owned public spaces
Shopping malls established in 2005
Office buildings completed in 2005
2005 establishments in England
Victoria, London